The Islands of Fleet are a group of small islands in Galloway, Scotland. They are in Fleet Bay, which is part of Wigtown Bay, and is in turn part of the Solway Firth in the Irish Sea. There are three main islands.

 Murray Isles, owned by the National Trust for Scotland, with the small rock "Horse Mark" off it.
 Ardwall Isle (Ard Bhaile - high town), which has a cairn and the remains of a chapel on it, and has the "Old Man of Fleet" off it.
 Barlocco Island, with the "Three Brethren" off it.

Ardwall Isle and Barlocco Isle are two of 43 tidal islands that can be walked to from the mainland of Great Britain and two of 17 that can be walked to from the Scottish mainland.

See also

 List of islands of Scotland
 List of outlying islands of Scotland

Notes

Islands of the Solway
Tidal islands of Scotland